This article summarizes the events related to rock music for the year of 2023.

Notable events

January 
 In a run that starts in December 2022, Metallica's song "Lux Aeterna" tops the Billboard Mainstream Rock chart, and stays atop of the chart for 10 weeks straight.
 Swedish rock band Katatonia releases their twelfth studio album, Sky Void of Stars. It debuts in the top 5 of three separate national album charts, in Germany, Finland, and Switzerland.
 Previously labeled as a country music artist, singer Hardy releases his second studio, The Mockingbird & the Crow, an album described as a mix of hard rock and country. The album debuts at number 4 on the US all-format Billboard 200 top albums chart, moving 34,000 album equivalent units. It is his first album to hit the top ten of the chart, and the highest debut for rock album since the Red Hot Chili Peppers in October 2022.
 The Smashing Pumpkins release the second part of their triple album Atum: A Rock Opera in Three Acts. The album is described as a sequel concept album exploring concepts started in the band's prior concept albums Mellon Collie and the Infinite Sadness (1996) and Machina/The Machines of God. The release has an uncommon release format, entailing three separate 11 song releases in 11 week intervals, culminating in a boxset release that contains all 33 songs and an additional 10 exclusive songs. Atum: Act One released November 15, 2022, Atum: Act Two on January 31, 2023, and Atum: Act Three and the box-set is scheduled for April 23, 2023.

February
 Paramore release their sixth studio album, This Is Why. Frontwoman Hayley Williams notes the album is more guitar-driven than their prior 2017 album, After Laughter. The album debuts at number 2 on the Billboard 200 albums chart, moving 64,000 album equivalent units. The album is the band's highest chart placement in a decade.

 Linkin Park release an previously unreleased song, "Lost", which was recorded over 20 years prior during the band's Meteora (2003) sessions. The song features vocals from Chester Bennington, who died in 2017, leaving the band relatively inactive since. The song find unexpected success on the charts, debuting a number 1 on the Billboard Rock & Alternative Airplay chart, and crossing over onto the US all-format Hot 100 chart at number 38. The song debuted at number 38  Billboard. This makes it just the fourth time that a song top the Rock & Alternative chart on its debut, and is their first top 40 single since 2012.
 Godsmack releases their sixth studio album, Lighting Up the Sky. The album was finished by mid-2022, but the band chose to focus on wrapping up touring for the rest of the year. Frontman Sully Erna states it may be the band's last album.

March 
 Meet Me at the Altar releases their debut studio album, Past // Present // Future in March. The band's success with music streaming figures of their initial singles and EPs garnered enough interest to be signed by the Fueled by Ramen record label (Fall Out Boy, Panic! at the Disco), and the album is described as sounding like early 2000s pop punk.

Future releases 

Fall Out Boy is scheduled to release their eighth studio album, So Much (for) Stardust in March. Its their first album in five years, and first since the 2000s to return to a more guitar-driven pop punk sound.

Metallica is scheduled to release their eleventh stuidio album, 72 Seasons, in April. The title is an allusion to the first 18 years of ones life, with the band stating that the album is themed around the ideas developed in one's youth.

 Blink-182 is scheduled to release their ninth studio album. Originally starting as bonus material for a deluxe release of their prior album, Nine (2019), it was later separated out as a separate release due to its differing sound and content. Initially scheduled release across 2020 and 2021, progress slowed due to the COVID-19 pandemic, Mark Hoppus's cancer diagnosis, and drummer Travis Barker recording and touring two albums with Machine Gun Kelly. Hoppus's cancer diagnosis restarted communication with original guitarist Tom Delonge, who rejoined the band in October 2022, with the band announcing the new album and a world tour both being scheduled for 2023.

 Avenged Sevenfold is scheduled to release their eighth studio album. The album will be their first since 2016. Progress with the album has been repeatedly slowed down and delayed due to the band's desire to record some parts of the album with a 78 piece orchestra conflicting with the COVID-19 pandemic and its various restrictions. It's now officially scheduled for release sometime in 2023.

 Sevendust is scheduled to release their fourteenth studio album. The band began demoing new material in mid-2022, with plans to enter the studio later that year.

 Mammoth WVH, the band of Eddie Van Halen's son Wolfgang Van Halen, is scheduled to release their second studio album. Work on the album began in September, and is expected to have a faster recording time than the original album, Mammoth WVG now that he's already figured out the band's vision and sound.

 Chevelle is scheduled to release their tenth studio album. The album was written across 2022, with plans to record by the end of the year and release it in 2023.

 The Killers are scheduled to release their eighth studio album. The album will be their third in four years, after Imploding the Mirage (2020) and Pressure Machine (2021)

Pearl Jam began work on their twelfth studio album. Work on it started in mid-2022 with Andrew Watt, who has been heavily involved with music production with pop musicians and in the 2020s, Ozzy Osbourne. The goal in working with him is to make more spontaneous music rather than the lengthy recording times of prior albums.

 British musician Steven Wilson (of the band Porcupine Tree) is scheduled to release his seventh studio album, The Harmony Codex. Like much of his work, it will be a concept album. 

Staind is scheduled to release their eighth studio album, their first new album in 12 years. Frontman Aaron Lewis, who spent much of the 2010s starting a country music career, expects the album to be a departure from his and the band's more mellow material, return to the band's "heavier" and "brutal" roots.

 Slipknot band members are scheduled to release an album. The album, Look Outside Your Window, was recorded by four of the band's member's in 2008 during the band's lengthy All Hope Is Gone sessions. It's not planned on being a traditional Slipknot album due to its more experimental and melodic rock sound. It's scheduled to release later in 2023 once band members are scheduled to leave their current record label.

 Filter is scheduled to release their eighth studio album, They've Got Us Right Where They Want Us, At Each Other's Throats. The album will be their first in seven years, having gone multiple iterations and scrapped plans, including partnering frontman Richard Patrick re-partnering with Brian Liesegang, his primary collaborator on the first Filter album, Short Bus.

 Jane's Addiction has announced their intention to release their first new material in a decade, though frontman Perry Farrell notes that it's unlikely to be a full album.

 The Offspring is scheduled to release their eleventh studio album.

 Corey Taylor is scheduled to release his second studio album, CMF2, named similarly to the first, CMFT.

Tours
 The surviving members of Pantera are scheduled to tour in 2023, their first tour in over 20 years. In place of the deceased Dimebag Darrell and Vinnie Paul will be guitarist Zakk Wylde and drummer Charlie Benante.
 Britpop band Pulp is scheduled to tour for the first time in over a decade.
 Blink 182 postpone the first leg of their 2023 world tour after drummer Travis Barker injures a finger. The March and April dates in Mexico and Latin America are postponed to 2024, while the North American leg remains in place to start in May.

Deaths 
10 January – Jeff Beck, 78, English guitarist and former member of The Yardbirds and The Jeff Beck Group
 12 January 
 Robbie Bachman, 69, Canadian drummer and founding member of Bachman-Turner Overdrive
 Lisa Marie Presley, 54, American singer and only child of Elvis Presley
 17 January – Van Conner, 55, American bassist and founding member of Screaming Trees
 18 January – David Crosby, 81, American guitarist and vocalist, former member of the Byrds and Crosby, Stills, Nash & Young
 14 February – Akira Tsuneoka, 51, Japanese drummer (Hi-Standard)
 16 February – Michael Kupper, 65, German heavy metal musician (Running Wild)
 20 February – Lyubomyr Futorsky, 50, Ukrainian singer (Dead Rooster)
23 February – Junnosuke Kuroda, 34, Japanese rock musician
5 March – Gary Rossington, 71, American guitarist and founding member of Lynyrd Skynyrd
8 March – Josua Madsen, 45, Danish drummer, (traffic accident)

Band breakups

 NOFX announced in September 2022 that the band plans to break up in 2023 after a series of farewell concerts.
 Panic! at the Disco announced in January 2023 that they plan on breaking up in 2023 after a final European tour.
 Fleetwood Mac

References

Rock
2023-related lists
Rock music by year